Dick Distich may refer to:

 A three volume novel by George Daniel
 A pseudonym of Alexander Pope